Tamka Street, ulica Tamka in Polish, is a street in the Powiśle district of Warsaw, Poland. The street runs downhill from central Warsaw toward the Vistula River and connects ulica Świętokrzyska with the Świętokrzyski Bridge.

The street's name originates from a small dam that once dammed a stream that formerly flowed along the course of the present street.

Streets in Warsaw